Sambucus is a genus of flowering plants in the family Adoxaceae. The various species are commonly referred to as elder, elderflower or elderberry. The genus was formerly placed in the honeysuckle family, Caprifoliaceae, but was reclassified as Adoxaceae due to genetic and morphological comparisons to plants in the genus Adoxa.

Description 
The oppositely arranged leaves are pinnate with 5–9 leaflets (or, rarely, 3 or 11). They bear large clusters of small white or cream-colored flowers in late spring; these are followed by clusters of small black, blue-black, or red berries (rarely yellow or white).

Color 

Sambucus fruit is rich in anthocyanidins that combine to give elderberry juice an intense blue-purple coloration that turns reddish on dilution with water. These pigments are used as colorants in various products, and "elderberry juice color" is listed by the US FDA as allowable in certified organic food products. In Japan, elderberry juice is listed as an approved "natural color additive" under the Food and Sanitation Law. Fibers can be dyed with elderberry juice (using alum as a mordant) to give a "muted purple" shade.

Toxicity 
Although the cooked berries (pulp and skin) of most species of Sambucus are edible, the uncooked berries and other parts of plants from this genus are poisonous. Leaves, twigs, branches, seeds, roots, flowers, and berries of Sambucus plants produce cyanogenic glycosides, which have toxic properties. Ingesting a sufficient quantity of cyanogenic glycosides from berry juice, flower tea, or beverages made from fresh leaves, branches, and fruit has been shown to cause illness, including nausea, vomiting, abdominal cramps, diarrhea, and weakness. In August 1983, a group of 25 people in Monterey County, California, became ill after ingesting elderberry juice pressed from fresh, uncooked Sambucus mexicana berries, leaves, and stems. The concentration of cyanogenic glycosides is higher in tea made from flowers (or leaves) than from the berries.

The seeds of Sambucus callicarpa are reported to be poisonous and may cause vomiting or diarrhea.

Taxonomy

The taxonomy of the genus Sambucus L., originally described by Carl Linnaeus and hence its botanical authority, has been complicated by its wide geographical distribution and morphological diversity. This has led to overdescription of the species and infraspecific taxa (subspecies, varieties or forms).
The name comes from the Greek word sambuce, an ancient wind instrument, about the removal of pith from the twigs to make whistles.

Species recognized in this genus are:

 Sambucus adnata – Himalaya and eastern Asia
 Sambucus australasica – New Guinea, eastern Australia
 Sambucus australis – South America
 Sambucus canadensis – eastern North America
 Sambucus cerulea – western North America
 Sambucus ebulus – central and southern Europe, northwest Africa and southwest Asia
 Sambucus gaudichaudiana – south eastern Australia
 Sambucus javanica – southeastern Asia
 Sambucus lanceolata – Madeira Island
 Sambucus latipinna –  Korea, southeast Siberia
 Sambucus melanocarpa – western North America
 Sambucus microbotrys – southwest North America
 Sambucus nigra – Europe and North America
 Sambucus orbiculata – western North America
 Sambucus palmensis – Canary Islands
 Sambucus peruviana – Costa Rica, Panama and northwest South America
 Sambucus pubens – northern North America
 Sambucus racemosa – northern, central and southeastern Europe, northwest Asia, western North America
 Sambucus sibirica – eastern Asia
 Sambucus sieboldiana – Japan and Korea
 Sambucus simpsonii – southeastern United States
 Sambucus tigranii – southwest Asia
 Sambucus velutina – southwestern North America
 Sambucus wightiana – western Himalayas
 Sambucus williamsii – northeast Asia

Distribution and habitat 

The genus occurs in temperate to subtropical regions of the world. More widespread in the Northern Hemisphere, its Southern Hemisphere occurrence is restricted to parts of Australasia and South America. Many species are widely cultivated for their ornamental leaves, flowers, and fruit.

Habitat 
Elder commonly grows near farms and homesteads. It is a nitrogen-dependent plant and thus is generally found near places of organic waste disposal. Elders are often grown as a hedgerow plant in Britain since they take very fast, can be bent into shape easily, and grow quite profusely, thus having gained the reputation of being 'an instant hedge'. It is not generally affected by soil type or pH level and will virtually grow anywhere sufficient sunlight is available.

Ecology 

In Northern California, elderberries are a food for migrating band-tailed pigeons. Elders are used as food plants by the larvae of some Lepidoptera species including brown-tail, buff ermine, dot moth, emperor moth, engrailed moth, swallow-tailed moth and the V-pug. The crushed foliage and immature fruit have a strong fetid smell. Valley elderberry longhorn beetles in California are very often found around red or blue elderberry bushes. Females lay their eggs on the bark. Strong-scented flowers in wild populations of European elder attract numerous, minute flower thrips which may contribute to the transfer of pollen between inflorescences.

Cultivation 

Traditional uses of Sambucus involved berries, seeds, leaves, and flowers or component extracts. Ornamental varieties of Sambucus are grown in gardens for their showy flowers, fruits and lacy foliage which support habitat for wildlife. Of the many native species, three are used as ornamentals, S. nigra, S. canadensis and S. racemosa.

Uses

Nutrition 
Raw elderberries are 80% water, 18% carbohydrates, and less than 1% each of protein and fat (table). In a  amount, elderberries supply  of food energy and are a rich source of vitamin C, providing 43% of the Daily Value (DV). Elderberries also have moderate contents of vitamin B6 (18% DV) and iron (12% DV), with no other nutrients in significant content.

Dietary supplement
Elderberry fruit or flowers are used as dietary supplements to prevent or provide relief from minor diseases, such as flu, colds, constipation, and other conditions, served as a tea, extract or in a capsule. The use of elderberry supplements increased early in the COVID-19 pandemic. There is insufficient research to establish its effectiveness for such uses, or its safety profile. The raw or unripe fruit of S. nigra or its extracts may contain a cyanogenic glycoside that is potentially toxic.

Traditional medicine 
Although practitioners of traditional medicine have used elderberry over centuries, there is little high-quality clinical evidence that such practices provide benefits, though the US National Institutes of Health have stated that "some preliminary research suggests that elderberry may relieve symptoms of flu or other upper respiratory infections."

Other
The flowers of Sambucus nigra are used to produce elderflower cordial. St-Germain, a French liqueur, is made from elderflowers. Hallands Fläder, a Swedish akvavit, is flavoured with elderflowers.

Hollowed elderberry twigs have traditionally been used as spiles to tap maple trees for syrup. Additionally, they have been hollowed out and used as flutes, blowguns, and syringes. In addition, the elderberry twigs and fruit are employed in creating dyes for basketry. These stems are dyed a very deep black by soaking them in a wash made from the berry stems of the elderberry.

The pith of elder has been used by watchmakers for cleaning tools before intricate work.

The fruit of S. callicarpa is eaten by birds and mammals. It is inedible to humans when raw but can be made into wine.

In popular culture 
Folklore related to elder trees is extensive and can vary according to region. In some traditions, the elder tree is thought to ward off evil and give protection from witches, while other beliefs say that witches often congregate under the plant, especially when it is full of fruit. If an elder tree was cut down, a spirit known as the Elder Mother would be released and take her revenge. The tree could only safely be cut while chanting a rhyme to the Elder Mother.

Made from the branch of an elder tree, the Elder Wand plays a pivotal role in the final book of the Harry Potter series, which was nearly named Harry Potter and the Elder Wand before author J. K. Rowling decided on Harry Potter and the Deathly Hallows.

Elton John's 1973 album Don't Shoot Me I'm Only the Piano Player features a song titled "Elderberry Wine".

In Monty Python and the Holy Grail, John Cleese as the French Taunter tells the knights of Camelot, "Your mother was a hamster, and your father smelt of elderberries."

Gallery

References 

 Attribution

Further reading

External links

 USDA National Organic Program National List Petition for Elderberry Juice Color

 
Berries
Butterfly food plants
Dipsacales genera
Drought-tolerant plants
Garden plants of North America
Medicinal plants
Taxa named by Carl Linnaeus